La Nouaille is a commune in the Creuse department in the Nouvelle-Aquitaine region in central France.

Geography

Population

Sights
 The twelfth-century church of Saint-Pierre-et-Saint-Paul.
 The fifteenth-century manorhouse, the Domaine de Banizette, a national heritage site.

See also
Communes of the Creuse department

References

Communes of Creuse